Ashish Patel (born July 31, 1975) is a Canadian cricketer. A medium-pacer, he took his place in the team given the absence of several players for the 2002 ICC Americas Championship, followed by a strong performance in the 2002 ICC Six Nations Challenge in Namibia.

He participated in the 2003 Cricket World Cup, and made an impressive debut in which he disposed of South Africans Herschelle Gibbs and Jacques Kallis. He took more wickets than any other bowler in the 2004 ICC Six Nations Challenge. He has not played for Canada since the final of the 2004 ICC Intercontinental Cup.

References
 Cricket Archive profile 
 Ashish Patel at Cricinfo

1975 births
Living people
Gujarati people
Canadian cricketers
Canada One Day International cricketers
Canadian people of Gujarati descent
Cricketers from Quebec
Canadian sportspeople of Indian descent